Haplochromis gilberti is a species of cichlid endemic to Lake Victoria.  This species can reach a length of  SL. The specific name honours Michael Gilbert who was the Experimental Fisheries Officer at the East African Freshwater Fisheries Research Organisation.

References

gilberti
Fish described in 1969
Taxonomy articles created by Polbot